Hollar (or Hollars) may refer to:

People
B. J. Hollars (born 1984), American literary essayist and nonfiction novelist
Bill Hollar (1938–2012), American race car driver
John Hollar (1922–1997), American football fullback
Steve Hollar (born 1966), American actor and dentist
Wenceslaus Hollar (1607–1677), Bohemian graphic artist

Others 
Hollar!, an album by Etta Jones
Hollar Hosiery Mills-Knit Sox Knitting Mills, a historic knitting mill in North Carolina, U.S.A.
The Hollars, a 2016 American comedy-drama film
"The Savage Hollar", a nickname of Victoria, Newfoundland and Labrador, an incorporated town in Canada
46280 Hollar, a main-belt asteroid named for Wenceslaus Hollar

A lower area between higher elevations

See also
Holler (disambiguation)